{{DISPLAYTITLE:C10H14FN}}
The molecular formula C10Hx14FN may refer to:

 2-Fluoromethamphetamine (2-FMA) 
 3-Fluoromethamphetamine (3-FMA) 
 4-Fluoromethamphetamine (4-FMA)

References